The siege of Fuenterrabía of 1638 took place in June – September 1638, between Spain and France during the Thirty Years' War and the Franco-Spanish War (1635-1659).

The French army commanded by Henri de Bourbon, Prince of Condé, Bernard de La Valette, Duke d'Épernon and Henri d'Escoubleau de Sourdis composed of 27,000 men and several warships besieged the city for two months, firing 16,000 shells into the walled city, leaving only 300 survivors, most of them women and children. The city was virtually destroyed, but nevertheless did not surrender.

On 7 September, the Spanish army led by Juan Alfonso Enríquez de Cabrera, 9th Admiral of Castile, relieved the city and defeated the French forces. The raising of the siege is celebrated annually on 8 September in a parade, known as Alarde.

After the French disaster of Fuenterrabía (Hondarribia), Henri d'Escoubleau de Sourdis attempted to blame the defeat on Bernard de La Valette, Duke d'Épernon, who had refused to lead the attack, believing that it would fail.

For the successful resistance, the city received the title of «Muy noble, muy leal, muy valerosa y muy siempre fiel».

References

Geoffrey Parker, Spain and the War, The Thirty Years' War London Routledge (1984).
Hondarribia: El Sitio de 1638. Auñamendi Entziklopedia

Notes

External links
  Las fortificaciones de Fuenterrabía ante el Sitio de 1638.
  Clave historial con que se abre la puerta a la historia eclesiástica y política, 1742.
 Official Website Information available in Spanish, Basque and English.

Fuenterrabía
Fuenterrabía
Fuenterrabia (1638)
Fuenterrabia (1638)
Fuenterrabía
Fuenterrabía
1638 in Spain